Rupert of Hentzau is a 1915 British adventure film of the silent era. It was directed by George Loane Tucker and starred Henry Ainley, Jane Gail and Gerald Ames. It was based on the 1898 novel Rupert of Hentzau by Anthony Hope, the sequel to The Prisoner of Zenda (1894). It tells the story of the journey of an Englishmen to Ruritania in Eastern Europe where he is forced to impersonate a King to thwart the plans of a villainous aristocrat Rupert of Hentzau.

It was released in the United States in 1916, which sometimes leads to it being attributed to that year. It was later re-released in 1918 at the end of the First World War. It is believed to be a lost film, no longer known to exist in any studio archives, private collections or public archives such as the Library of Congress.

Cast
Henry Ainley as Rudolf Rassendyll / Rudolf V
Jane Gail as Queen Flavia
Gerald Ames as Rupert of Hentzau
Charles Rock as Colonel Sapt
George Bellamy as Count von Rischenheim
Warwick Wellington as Lieutenant Bernenstein
Douglas Munro as Bauer
Stella St. Audrie as Chancellor's Wife

See also
List of lost films

References

External links

1915 films
1915 adventure films
British silent feature films
Films directed by George Loane Tucker
Films based on works by Anthony Hope
Lost British films
Films set in Europe
Films based on British novels
British black-and-white films
British adventure films
1915 lost films
Lost adventure films
Silent adventure films
1910s British films